Rosie and the Originals were an American 1960s musical group best known for their single "Angel Baby." Fronted by lead singer Rosie Hamlin, the group produced two singles (including "Angel Baby") for Highland Records and, like many other musicians of the era, ended up in protracted legal battles with their record label over royalties and credits.

Career

Establishment
Rosalie "Rosie" Méndez Hamlin was raised in Anchorage, Alaska before moving to California; she was of Mexican and English descent. She was trained on piano in her youth, and started singing with a band at thirteen. She wrote the lyrics for "Angel Baby" as a poem for "[her] very first boyfriend" when she was 14 years old, still attending Mission Bay High School in San Diego, California. When she was 15, she and some friends rented the only recording studio they could find within 100 miles of San Diego located in San Marcos, California to record the song. The studio was owned by an airplane mechanic who had taken part of his hangar to make it. After taking the master to a department store, they convinced a manager to play it in the listening booth of the store's music department. The song received positive reactions from teenage listeners, and a scout from Highland Records offered the group a recording contract, under the condition that the company take possession of the master recording, and that David Ponce be named as the author of the song, as he was the eldest member of the group.

"Angel Baby" made its radio debut in November 1960, before the group had even received their contract. When the contract finally came, Hamlin found that she was ineligible to collect record royalties from the song because she was not listed as the songwriter. This led to the group's break-up, and although Hamlin secured the copyright to her music in 1961, decades of battles over royalties followed.

In 1961, "Angel Baby" was also released in Canada (#6) on the Zirkon label and in Australia and England on London Records. The British release slightly edited the intro.

Departure from Highland Records
After leaving Highland Records, Hamlin recorded a full-length album with guitarist Noah Tafolla for Brunswick Records and toured with the label's other artists under her solo name. Hamlin and Tafolla married and had two children together. Their son Joey Tafolla is a guitarist best known for his solo career in the 1980s, and for being a member of the band Jag Panzer. In 1963, Hamlin retired from singing to spend time with her family. She returned to record singles in 1969 and again in 1973, performing occasionally throughout the 1970s and 1980s and more regularly throughout the 1990s and 2000s, which included performances at Madison Square Garden in 2002.

Later years
In 1995, Rosie & the Originals were portrayed in the film My Family, performing "Angel Baby." Hamlin's part was played by Jeanette Jurado of the group Expose. In 1996, Linda Ronstadt recorded a version of "Angel Baby" for her album Dedicated to the One I Love.

In 1999, Ace Records released The Best of Rosie & the Originals, including all the Highland tracks as well as Brunswick recordings and unreleased tracks. The following year, the label released the album Angel Baby Revisited, with previously unreleased material. In 2002, Hamlin performed "Angel Baby" on a PBS-TV program, Red White & Rock. Hamlin died in Belen, New Mexico on March 30, 2017, aged 71.

Legacy
In a 1969 interview with Life magazine, John Lennon named Hamlin as one of his favorite singers. As can be heard on circulating recordings, the Beatles mention the song "Give Me Love" during sessions on 01/24/69. Lennon and friends can be heard in a quickly busked version of "Angel Baby," taped at his birthday in 1971. Lennon recorded a studio version of "Angel Baby" for his 1975 Rock 'n' Roll album, but the track was not issued until 1986's Menlove Avenue. Rosie and the Originals are referenced by Led Zeppelin in the liner notes from their 1973 album Houses of the Holy, following the printed lyrics of the song "D'yer Mak'er." The quote is "Whatever happened to Rosie and the Originals?" "Rosie" also shows up in the Led Zeppelin song "How Many More Times".

Discography

Singles
 "Angel Baby"/"Give Me Love" (Highland, 1960)
 "Why Did You Leave Me"/"Angel from Above"(Highland, 1961)
 "Lonely Blue Nights"/"We’ll Have a Chance" (Brunswick, 1961)
 "Lonely Blue Nights"/"We’ll Have a Chance" (Highland, 1961) 
 "My Darling Forever"/"The Time Is Near" (Brunswick, 1961) 
 "Kinda Makes You Wonder"/"My One and Only Love" (Globe, 1962)
 "You're No Good"/"You Don’t Understand" (Wax World, 1973)

Albums
 Lonely Blue Nights (Brunswick, 1962)
 The Best of Rosie & the Originals (Ace, 1999)
 Angel Baby Revisited (Ace, 2000)

Sample

References

External links
Official website
Destination Doo-wop history
[ Allmusic biography]
Label shots & history
Interview

Doo-wop groups
1960 establishments in California
Musical groups established in 1960